Jalandhar Cantonment railway station (station code: JRC) is located in Jalandhar district in the Indian state of  Punjab and serves Jalandhar.

The railway station

History

The line from Jalandhar City to Mukerian was constructed in 1915. The Mukerian–Pathankot line was built in 1952. The construction of the Pathankot–Jammu Tawi line was initiated in 1965, after the Indo-Pakistani War of 1965, and opened in 1971.

Hoshiarpur was linked by rail with Jullundur Cantonment in 1913.

Electrification
The Phagwara–Jalandhar City–Amritsar sector was electrified in 2003–04.

DMU shed
India's first and largest DMU shed at Jalandhar holds 90 units placed in service in rural Punjab. It also houses two BEML-built rail buses which operate on the Beas–Goindwal Sahib line.

References

External links
Trains at Jalandhar Cantonment

Railway stations in Jalandhar district
Firozpur railway division
Transport in Jalandhar
Buildings and structures in Jalandhar